R. White's Lemonade is a British brand of a carbonated lemonade, which is produced and sold in the United Kingdom by Britvic. Robert and Mary White produced the first R. White's lemonade in Camberwell, south London, in 1845. The White Family took over H. D. Rawlings Ltd. in 1891, the year that it was incorporated—a merger which made White's the biggest soft drinks company in London and the south-east—and then R. White & Sons Ltd. was itself incorporated in 1894. The company was taken over by Whitbread in the 1960s, and was later absorbed by Britvic in 1986, when Britvic and Canada Dry Rawlings Ltd merged.

In the 1970s R. White's also made orangeade, dandelion and burdock, and cream soda. The lemonade product, formerly made using sugar, has (as of 2012, possibly earlier) changed the traditional recipe, replacing some sugar with aspartame, saccharin and acesulfame K.  R. White's still contains real lemons and is available in regular, diet, Traditional Cloudy, Raspberry, Pear and Elderflower varieties. A television commercial from the 1970s – "Secret Lemonade Drinker" – was ranked seventh in a 2000 UK wide poll of "The 100 Greatest TV Ads".

History
In 1845, Robert and Mary White started selling home-brewed ginger beer from a wheelbarrow in Camberwell, London under Robert White's name. As a nod to this heritage, today the wheelbarrow features in Britvic's packaging of R. White's drinks. The business saw rapid expansion, and by the late 1860s it had five production units and 16 depots in the midlands of England and London. White's, who had concentrated on lemonade, took over H. D. Rawlings Ltd, a company that specialised in mixers, and the merger made White's the biggest soft drinks company in London and south-east England. Robert White's  sons, Robert James and John George, joined the business, and they became R. White & Sons Ltd.

By 1887, White's produced a range of flavours and products, all of which were sold in Codd’s glass bottles. Choices available included strawberry soda, raspberry soda, cherryade, cream soda, pineapple cider, ginger beer, soda water and orange champagne. Prices ranged from eightpence to a shilling per dozen. At the beginning of the 20th century more than 40 different soft drink flavours were on sale.

In 1914, during the First World War, over 100 R. White employees served in the armed forces and the company supplied the government with over half their horses and vans. In the Second World War, a great part of the vehicle fleet was commandeered by the government and used by the army. During the Blitz three major factories were wiped out in London alone.

Marketing
In 1973, the 'Secret Lemonade Drinker' advertising campaign was launched by London agency Allen, Brady and Marsh and devised by Rod Allen, who wrote the slogan. The adverts featured actor Julian Chagrin in pyjamas creeping downstairs to raid the fridge for R. Whites Lemonade. Ross McManus wrote and sang the advert's song, with his son Declan McManus (later known as Elvis Costello) providing the backing vocals. An alternative, unaired version of the advert featured Costello and his father onstage, as the 'Secret Lemonade Drinker' fantasised about being a rock star.

The commercials were the brand's best known advertising campaign, and continued to air until 1984 and won a silver award at the 1974 International Advertising Festival. The secret lemonade drinker was reintroduced in 1993, starring actor & comedian Julian Dutton as the eponymous Secret Lemonade Drinker, and various celebrities have featured in the commercials including comedian Ronnie Corbett and tennis player John McEnroe. In 2000, “Secret Lemonade Drinker” was ranked seventh in Channel 4's poll of "The 100 Greatest TV Ads".

See also

 List of lemonade topics

References

External links

 Britvic - R. White's Lemonade

Lemonade
British drink brands
British drinks
Carbonated drinks
1845 establishments in England
Products introduced in 1845
British brands